Sydney-Pyrmont was an electoral district of the Legislative Assembly in the Australian state of New South Wales, created in 1894, partly replacing the multi-member electorate of West Sydney. It was named after and included the Sydney suburb of Pyrmont, consisting of the entire peninsula north of Fig Street and east of Wattle Street. In 1904, it was largely replaced by Pyrmont, which also absorbed part of the abolished district of Sydney-Denison.

Members for Sydney-Pyrmont

Election results

Notes

References

Former electoral districts of New South Wales
Constituencies established in 1894
1894 establishments in Australia
Constituencies disestablished in 1904
1904 disestablishments in Australia